Yajiangqiao Town is an urban town in You County, Hunan Province, People's Republic of China.

Cityscape
The town is divided into 17 villages, the following areas: Xianshi Village, Penshang Village, Mingyue Village, Shuangjiang Village, Lianjiang Village, Xinshanling Village, Wanxing Village, Huayu Village, Zengjiaxin Village, Yuanjia Village, Yanliang Village, Liansheng Village, Sanfeng Village, Songjiang Village, Tongfu Village, Zhonghe Village, and Zhangshu Village (仙石村、盆上村、明月村、双江村、联江村、新杉岭村、万兴村、华裕村、增佳新村、源佳村、严良村、联胜村、三峰村、松江村、同富村、中和村、樟树村).

References

External links

Divisions of You County